Pentapleura is a genus of flowering plant in the family Lamiaceae, first described in 1913. It contains only one known species, Pentapleura subulifera, native to southeastern Turkey and northern Iraq.

References

Lamiaceae
Flora of Iraq
Monotypic Lamiaceae genera
Taxa named by Heinrich von Handel-Mazzetti